Cape Fear is a 1991 American psychological thriller film directed by Martin Scorsese. It is a remake of the 1962 film of the same name, which was based on the 1957 novel The Executioners by John D. MacDonald. The film stars Robert De Niro, Nick Nolte, Jessica Lange, Joe Don Baker, and Juliette Lewis. Robert Mitchum has a small role in the film, while Gregory Peck (in his final theatrical film role) and Martin Balsam make cameo appearances, all three having starred in the original film.

The film tells the story of a convicted violent rapist who, by using his newfound knowledge of the law and its numerous loopholes, seeks vengeance against a former public defender whom he blames for his 14-year imprisonment due to purposefully faulty defense tactics used during his trial.

Cape Fear marks the seventh collaboration between Scorsese and De Niro. The film was a commercial success and received positive reviews. It was nominated for several awards, including the Oscars and Golden Globe Awards for Best Actor (De Niro) and Best Supporting Actress (Juliette Lewis).

Plot

Sam Bowden is a lawyer residing in New Essex, North Carolina, with his wife Leigh and teenage daughter Danielle (known as "Danny"). Max Cady, one of Sam's former clients, has just been released from prison after serving a 14-year sentence for the rape and battery of a 16-year-old girl. Sam had buried evidence of the victim's promiscuity and Max's ignorance of her true age, which might have reduced his sentence or even led to his acquittal.

Sam assumes that Max, who was illiterate during his trial, is still unaware of the shoddy defense he received. However, unbeknownst to Sam, Max is a naturally gifted and single-minded psychopath who taught himself to read and studied law while in prison. He even attempted several unsuccessful appeals of his conviction.

Max tracks down Sam and begins to terrorize his family. He loiters near their property, and their dog is killed under mysterious circumstances. Sam tries to have Max arrested, but the police have no evidence of a crime. Max deliberately crosses paths with Lori Davis, a County Courthouse clerk who has been flirting with Sam. Max then rapes and nearly beats Lori to death. Despite Sam's suggestion to press charges, Lori refuses out of fear that their ongoing platonic flirtation becomes public.

Sam hires a private investigator, Claude Kersek, to keep an eye on Max.

Max approaches 15-year-old Danielle Bowden by impersonating her new drama teacher and feigning an unorthodox interest in her teenage angst. He lures her to the school theater, shares a joint with her, manipulates her libido and attraction to him, and kisses her. When her parents find the joint in her schoolbook and discover the extent of Max's seduction, Danny's coyness about the events angers her father, Sam, and drives him to desperation. Sam agrees to Kersek's earlier plan to have Max beaten up. Sam also gives Max a final warning, which Max secretly records with a hidden recorder. 

Kersek's three hired thugs accost and beat Max with chains and pipes as Sam watches from behind a dumpster. However, Max turns the tide on his attackers and viciously beats them instead. Max then uses his recording of Sam's threat and an exaggerated display of his own injuries to file for a restraining order against Sam. Max's lawyer, Lee Heller, also petitions the ABA Ethics Committee for Sam's disbarment, triggering a two-day emergency meeting in Raleigh.

Kersek anticipates Max's intention to break into the Bowden house while Sam is in Raleigh. The family fakes Sam's departure and hides in the house, hoping that Max will break in, so that he can be shot in self-defense. However, Max sneaks in and kills the Bowdens' housekeeper, Graciela, and dons her clothing before murdering Kersek by garroting him with a piano wire and shooting him with his own pistol. Horrified after discovering the bodies, the Bowdens flee to their houseboat docked upstate along the Cape Fear River.

Max, who has followed the family, attacks Sam and prepares to rape Leigh and Danny while making Sam watch. Danny sprays Max with lighter fluid as he lights a cigar, engulfing him in flames and causing him to jump off the boat. However, Max clings to a rope and pulls himself back on board. As the boat is rocked by a violent thunderstorm and the raging river, a badly burned and deranged Max confronts Sam, putting him on a mock trial for his deliberate negligence 14 years ago. Despite Sam's insistence that Max bragged about beating two prior rape charges and that his crime was too heinous for the promiscuity report to be taken into account, Max berates him for failing to do his duty as a lawyer.

The storm eventually knocks Max off his feet, allowing Sam to gain the upper hand once the women jump off the boat and make it to shore. Sam uses Max's handcuffs to shackle him to the boat. When the boat hits a rock and is destroyed, the fight continues on the shore, but a raging tide carries Max away and he drowns while speaking in tongues and singing the hymn "On Jordan's Stormy Banks I Stand". Sam washes the blood from his hands before he rejoins Leigh and Danny, who realize that things will never be the same again for them.

Cast

Production
The film's screenplay was adapted by Wesley Strick from the original screenplay by James R. Webb, which was based on the novel The Executioners by John D. MacDonald.

Originally developed by Steven Spielberg, he eventually decided it was too violent and traded it to Scorsese in exchange for Schindler's List, which Scorsese had decided not to make. Scorsese agreed to direct Cape Fear because Universal supported his controversial film The Last Temptation of Christ.
Although Spielberg stayed on as a producer through his company Amblin Entertainment, he chose not to be credited personally on the finished film.

Although Scorsese had previously worked with Nolte in New York Stories (1989), he originally envisioned Harrison Ford in the role of Sam Bowden. However, Ford agreed to be in the film only if he could play Max Cady. Nolte, who was interested in playing Bowden, convinced Scorsese to cast him instead. Drew Barrymore and Reese Witherspoon both auditioned for the part of Danielle Bowden and Spielberg reportedly wanted Bill Murray to play Cady.

Despite being taller than De Niro, who stands at 5'9", Nolte lost weight for the film while De Niro gained muscle, giving the appearance that Cady is the stronger man.

The work of Alfred Hitchcock was a significant influence on the style of Cape Fear. As with the 1962 film, where director J. Lee Thompson specifically acknowledged Hitchcock's influence and employed Bernard Herrmann to write the score, Scorsese also adopted Hitchcock's style, using unusual camera angles, lighting, and editing techniques. The opening credits were designed by Saul Bass, a frequent collaborator of Hitchcock, and the link to Hitchcock was further cemented by the reuse of Herrmann's original score, albeit reworked by Elmer Bernstein. Portions of Bass's title sequences were reused from the unreleased ending to his film Phase IV.

Reception

Box office
Cape Fear collected $10.5 million during its opening weekend, ranking in first place at the box office, beating out Curly Sue. It would be overtaken by The Addams Family a week later, but still made another $10 million while staying ahead of Beauty and the Beast. The film was a box-office success, making $182,291,969 worldwide on a $35-million budget.

Critical response
On review aggregator website Rotten Tomatoes the film holds an approval rating of 75% based on 55 reviews, with an average score of 6.9/10. The site's critics consensus reads: "Smart and stylish, Cape Fear is a gleefully mainstream shocker from Martin Scorsese, with a terrifying Robert De Niro performance." On Metacritic, the film has a weighted average score of 73 out of 100, based on 9 critics, indicating "generally favorable reviews". Audiences polled by CinemaScore gave the film an average grade of "B+" on an A+ to F scale.

Roger Ebert gave the film three stars, commenting:

Awards and honors

In popular culture
The film was parodied in the 1993 Simpsons episode "Cape Feare", with Sideshow Bob in the role of Cady. They also pay homage to another Robert Mitchum film The Night of the Hunter in which Sideshow Bob's knuckles (scaled down for a cartoon character with one fewer finger on each hand) say "Luv" (Love) and "Hāt" (Hate, with the diacritical mark providing the long vowel). This parody was itself the basis for Anne Washburn's play Mr. Burns, a Post-Electric Play, which imagines post-apocalyptic theatre troupes attempting to recreate the episode, and by extension the two films and the novel.

The film was parodied as Cape Munster in the premiere episode of The Ben Stiller Show, with Ben Stiller playing an adult Eddie Munster.

The film was the inspiration for professional wrestler Dan Spivey's character Waylon Mercy in the World Wrestling Federation (now WWE) in 1995, and subsequently for professional wrestler Bray Wyatt's original The Wyatt Family character in WWE in 2013.

See also
 List of films featuring home invasions
 List of 1991 box office number-one films in the United States
 Night and the City, another remake also starring De Niro and Lange

References

Further reading
 Thain, Gerald J. 2001. "Cape Fear, Two Versions and Two Visions Separated by Thirty Years." Law and Film: Representing Law in Movies, edited by S. Machura and P. Robson. Cambridge: Blackwell Publishing. .

External links

 
 
 
 
 

1991 films
1991 crime thriller films
1990s American films
1990s English-language films
1990s legal films
1990s psychological thriller films
Amblin Entertainment films
American crime thriller films
American films about revenge
American legal films
American psychological thriller films
Films scored by Bernard Herrmann
Films scored by Elmer Bernstein
Films about families
Films about lawyers
Films about murderers
Films about rape
Films about stalking
Films based on American novels
Films based on thriller novels
Films based on works by John D. MacDonald
Films directed by Martin Scorsese
Films set in 1991
Films set in a movie theatre
Films set in North Carolina
Films set on boats
Films shot in California
Films shot in Florida
Films shot in Georgia (U.S. state)
Home invasions in film
Independence Day (United States) films
Remakes of American films
Southern Gothic films
Universal Pictures films